Asian Economic Papers is a peer-reviewed academic journal that focuses on the analysis of economic issues in Asia. The journal was founded in 2000 and is published online and in hard copy by the MIT Press. Asian Economic Papers is sponsored by The Earth Institute at Columbia University, the Global Security Research Center at Keio University, the Korea Institute for International Economic Policy, and the Global Development Program at the Brookings Institution.

See also
 Economy of Asia

External links 
 

 Economics journals
 MIT Press academic journals
 English-language journals
 Publications established in 2000
 Triannual journals